Mutanabbi Street (Arabic: شارع المتنبي) is located in Baghdad, Iraq, near the old quarter of Baghdad; at Al Rasheed Street. It is the historic center of Baghdad bookselling, a street filled with bookstores and outdoor book stalls. It was named after the 10th-century classical Iraqi poet AlMutanabbi.
This street is well established for bookselling and has often been referred to as the heart and soul of the Baghdad literacy and intellectual community. 

A car bomb or suicide bomb exploded and killed 26 people on Mutanabbi Street on March 5, 2007, leaving the area littered and unsafe for shoppers, and destroying many businesses. In response to the bombing, Deema Shehabi and Beau Beausoleil edited an anthology in 2012 called Al-Mutanabbi Street Starts Here of people's responses to the bombing. The 100 contributors included Yassin Alsalman and Pulitzer prize-winning journalist Anthony Shadid, among others.

On December 18, 2008, Iraqi Prime Minister Nouri al-Maliki officially reopened the street after a long period of cleanup and repair.

Gallery

References

External links
 San Francisco Center for the Book. Al-Mutanabbi Street Starts Here art exhibit 

Neighborhoods in Baghdad
Streets in Baghdad
Bookstore neighborhoods
Culture in Baghdad